Isothermal flow is a model of compressible fluid flow whereby the flow remains at the same temperature while flowing in a conduit. In the model, heat transferred through the walls of the conduit is offset by frictional heating back into the flow. Although the flow temperature remains constant, a change in stagnation temperature occurs because of a change in velocity. This fact applies to real gases as well as ideal gases.

For an important practical case of a gas flow through a long tube, the model has an applicability in situations which occurs in a relatively long distance and where heat transfer is relatively rapid so that the temperature can be treated, for engineering purposes, as a constant. This model has also applicability as upper boundary to Fanno flow.

See also
Fanno flow
Isentropic process
Rayleigh flow

References

External links
 Fundamentals of compressible Flow

Fluid dynamics